Anahí is a Mexican singer, songwriter, actress, record producer and dancer.

Ariel Awards
The Ariel Award is the Mexican Academy of Film Award. It has been awarded annually since 1947. The award recognizes excellence in motion picture making, such as acting, directing and screenwriting in Mexican cinema. It is considered the most prestigious award in the Mexican movie industry. Anahí has received one award.

Latin Music Italian Awards

TVyNovelas Awards
The TVyNovelas Awards, also known as the Premios TVyNovelas are presented annually by Televisa and the magazine TVyNovelas to honour the best Mexican television productions, especially telenovelas. Anahí received five nominations and one win.

Billboard Music Video Award
The Billboard Music Video Awards are sponsored by Billboard magazine to honor artists and their music videos. Anahí has received one nomination.

OTTI Awards

Palme d'Or Awards

Eres Awards
Anahi has received one award.

G1 Globo Awards
Made by globo.com Brazilian portal launched in 2000, and belongs to the company Organizações Globo, Anahi won by the election of the public with his album "Mi Delirio" in 2009.

Galardon a los Grandes Awards
Created by Raul Velasco, the program Siempre en Domingo. Anahí has received one nomination.

Nickelodeon
The Nickelodeon Kids' Choice Awards is an annual awards show, that honors the year's biggest television, movie, and music acts, as voted by the people.

Argentina Kids' Choice Awards
The Kids' Choice Awards Argentina were established in 2011. Anahí has received one nomination.

Mexico Kids' Choice Awards
Mexico Kids' Choice Awards, also known as Mis Prémios Nick, were established in 2010. Anahí has received two awards from five nominations.

Orgullosamente Latino Awards
Orgullosamente Latino Awards is the Latino awards organised by the Ritmoson Latino. The show has been held annually since 2004 and is voted on by the general public. Anahí has received one award from four nominations.

Arlequin Awards
Anahi award received by his artistic career in Mexico.

E! Entertainment Awards
Anahí has received one award.

People en Español Awards
People en Español Awards is a music award granted every year by the magazine People en Español. Anahí has received three awards from eight nominations.

Prêmio Febreteen

Premios Juventud
The Premios Juventud is an awards show for Spanish-speaking celebrities in the areas of film, music, sports, fashion, and pop culture, presented by the television network Univision. Anahí has received twenty seven nominations.

Quiero Awards
Anahí has received one nomination.

Red Diez Social Awards
Anahí has received two awards.

Telehit Awards
Telehit Awards is the Latino awards organised by the Telehit. Anahí has received one nomination.

Texas Awards
Texas Awards is an annual awards show for Spanish-speaking celebrities that honors the year's biggest music acts. Anahí has received two nomination.

Top TVZ Awards
Top TVZ Awards are organised by the program TVZ, Brazil. This trophy is to reward the top 10 national and international singers.

Tu Mundo Awards
The "Tu Mundo Awards" are organized by the U.S. television network Telemundo, being the 30 August the first installment of the awards, taking place in the city of Miami. It has 24 categories and awards the best of music and television, as well as sports and modeling.

Recognitions

References

External links
 Official Website

Anahi
Awards